Eider Lenina Torres Sandoval (born January 16, 1983) is a Venezuelan professional baseball coach and former second baseman in Major League Baseball (MLB).

Playing career
From 2002 to 2006, Torres played in the Cleveland Indians farm system for the Burlington Indians, Mahoning Valley Scrappers, Kinston Indians, Akron Aeros, and Buffalo Bisons.

Baltimore Orioles
In 2007, Torres became a member of the Baltimore Orioles organization. He played in their minor league system for the Triple-A Norfolk Tides during the 2007 and 2008 seasons. On April 25, 2008, Torres' contract was purchased by Baltimore when Adam Loewen was placed on the disabled list. He made his major league debut the next day against the Chicago White Sox. He appeared in a total of eight MLB games for Baltimore, batting 2-for-9 (.222).

Later career
Torres became a free agent at the end of the 2008 season and signed a minor league contract with the Chicago White Sox. During the 2009 season, he played for the Triple-A Charlotte Knights, and hit .240 with a home run and 29 RBI in 92 games. During the 2010 season, Torres played in the Colorado Rockies organization at the Triple-A and Double-A levels. Torres last played professionally in the Venezuelan Professional Baseball League during the 2010–11 and 2011–12 seasons.

Post-playing career
In January 2019, the Boston Red Sox announced that Torres had been hired to serve as hitting coach for one Boston's teams in the Dominican Summer League.

See also
 List of Major League Baseball players from Venezuela

References

External links

1983 births
Living people
Águilas del Zulia players
Akron Aeros players
Baltimore Orioles players
Bravos de Margarita players
Buffalo Bisons (minor league) players
Burlington Indians players (1986–2006)
Charlotte Knights players
Colorado Springs Sky Sox players
Kinston Indians players
Mahoning Valley Scrappers players
Major League Baseball players from Venezuela
Major League Baseball second basemen
Norfolk Tides players
Pastora de los Llanos players
Sportspeople from Maracaibo
Tulsa Drillers players
Venezuelan expatriate baseball players in the United States
Minor league baseball coaches